Skyline Sports Complex is a sports complex/stadium on City Island, along the Susquehanna River, in Harrisburg, Pennsylvania.

The original structure was built in 1987 and is adjacent to FNB Field.

The complex/stadium hosts numerous events annually and was the home stadium for the Harrisburg City Islanders soccer team until 2016. It was formerly home to the Central Penn Piranha football team.

The field was under renovation in 2008, which included repositioning and the planting of new grass, in preparation for the 2009 Islanders' season. The upgrade project was headed by Mayor Stephen R. Reed and completed internally by the City of Harrisburg's Department of Parks and Recreation staff.

Stadium Expansion/Upgrade
As of 2015, the parent company of the Harrisburg City Islanders, the Harrisburg Capital Soccer, Inc. have begun applying for grant funding to facilitate upgrades to the existing complex. The proposed upgrades are anticipated to include increasing capacity to 5,000 seats, VIP areas, entrance plaza, upgraded concessions, restrooms, indoor locker rooms, broadcasting booth, and a new scoreboard. New seating is intended to be an upgrade from existing bleachers with a mix of individual bucket seats, ten suites, a VIP deck with seating, and bleacher seats with back supports.

References

External links
 Stadium page on Penn FC website
 Harrisburg Parks & Recreation Page
 Skyline Sports Complex at Google Maps

Penn FC
Sports venues in Harrisburg, Pennsylvania
Soccer venues in Pennsylvania
Tourist attractions in Harrisburg, Pennsylvania
Sports venues completed in 1987
1987 establishments in Pennsylvania
American football venues in Pennsylvania
Sports complexes in the United States